Rolf Pinegger (25 March 1873 – 18 October 1957) was a German stage and film actor who appeared in over forty films, generally in supporting roles.

Selected filmography
 The Dying Salome (1919)
 The Last Shot (1920)
 The Blame (1924)
 Behind Monastery Walls (1928)
 The Foreign Legionnaire (1928)
 Andreas Hofer (1929)
 White Majesty (1934)
 The Hunter of Fall (1936)
 Home Guardsman Bruggler (1936)
 Frau Sixta (1938)
 Storms in May (1938)
 The Right to Love (1939)
 Wally of the Vultures (1940)
 The War of the Oxen (1943)
 The Disturbed Wedding Night (1950)
 The Violin Maker of Mittenwald (1950)
 Kissing Is No Sin (1950)
 The Cloister of Martins (1951)
 The Monastery's Hunter (1953)

Bibliography
 Richards, Jeffrey. Visions of Yesterday. Routledge, 1973.

External links

1873 births
1957 deaths
German male film actors
German male silent film actors
German male stage actors
People from Landsberg (district)
20th-century German male actors
Male actors from Bavaria